Latvia–Mexico relations are the diplomatic relations between Latvia and Mexico. Both nations are members of the Organisation for Economic Co-operation and Development and the United Nations.

History
In November 1918, Latvia declared its independence from the Russian Empire after World War I. In May 1927, Mexico recognized Latvia's independence. During World War II, Latvia was occupied by both Nazi Germany and the Soviet Union and after the war, Latvia was forcibly annexed by the Soviet Union in 1944. In May 1990, Latvia obtained its independence after the Dissolution of the Soviet Union. Mexico recognized the independence of and re-established diplomatic relations with Latvia on 27 November 1991. Since then, Mexico has been accredited to Latvia from its embassy in Stockholm, Sweden and Latvia has been accredited to Mexico from its embassy in Washington, D.C., United States.

In September 1993, Latvia opened an honorary consulate in Mexico City. In 2000, Mexico opened an honorary consulate in Riga. In June 2000, Mexican Foreign Undersecretary, Juan Rebolledo Gout, paid a visit Latvia and met with President Vaira Vike-Freiberga in Jūrmala. 

In March 2004, Latvian President Vaira Vike-Freiberga paid a visit to Mexico to attend the Latin America, the Caribbean and the European Union Summit in Guadalajara and met with Mexican President Vicente Fox. In 2007, Mexican Foreign Undersecretary Lourdes Aranda Bezaury paid a visit to Latvia to attend the third political consultations between the Ministries of Foreign Affairs of both nations. During the third political consultations, Latvia and Mexico discussed current issues related to domestic and foreign policy activities and exchanged views on global issues such as the UN reform, climate change and environmental protection, disarmament, and weapons of mass destruction.

In recent years, Foreign Ministerial meetings of both countries have been held in different international forums such as the meeting between Mexican Foreign Minister Patricia Espinosa and Latvian Foreign Minister Ģirts Valdis Kristovskis, held in the framework of the 66th General Assembly of the United Nations in September 2011. Both Foreign Ministers discussed the presence of Mexican multinational company CEMEX in Latvia and discussed climate change and the prospects for cooperation within the United Nations.

In April 2013, Latvian Foreign Vice-Minister Andris Teikmanis paid a visit to Mexico to attend the fifth political consultations between both nations and to celebrate the 80th anniversary since Mexico recognized the independent Latvian State. In May 2015, Mexican Senators Rabindranath Salazar Solorio and Gabriela Cuevas Barron attended the Euro-Latin American Parliamentary Assembly in Riga.

High-level visits
High-level visits from Latvia to Mexico
 President Vaira Vike-Freiberga (2004)
 Foreign Vice-Minister Andris Teikmanis (2013)

High-level visits from Mexico to Latvia
 Foreign Undersecretary Juan Rebolledo Gout (2000)
 Foreign Undersecretary Lourdes Aranda Bezaury (2007)
 Senator Rabindranath Salazar Solorio (2015)
 Senator Gabriela Cuevas Barron (2015)

Agreements
Both nations have signed several bilateral agreements such as a Memorandum of Understanding for the Establishment of a Mechanism of Bilateral Political Consultations in Matters of Common Interest (2000); Agreement on the suppression of visas for diplomatic and official passport carriers (2002); Agreement of Cooperation in the areas of Education, Culture and Sports (2006); and an Agreement to Avoid Double Taxation and Prevent Tax Evasion on Income Tax and its Protocol (2012).

Trade
In 2019, trade between both nations totaled US$55 million. Latvia's main exports to Mexico include: battery waste, mineral oils, vodka and electronic equipment. Mexico's main exports to Latvia include: tequila, orange juice, machines to make rope, and malt beer. Mexican multinational company Cemex operates in Latvia.

Diplomatic missions
 Latvia is accredited to Mexico from its embassy in Washington, D.C., United States and maintains an honorary consulate in Mexico City.
 Mexico is accredited to Latvia from its embassy in Stockholm, Sweden and maintains an honorary consulate in Riga.

See also  
 Foreign relations of Latvia 
 Foreign relations of Mexico

References 

 
Mexico
Latvia